Bilkisu Yusuf (born 8 June 1977) is a Nigerian judoka. She competed in the women's half-middleweight event at the 2000 Summer Olympics.

References

1977 births
Living people
Nigerian female judoka
Olympic judoka of Nigeria
Judoka at the 2000 Summer Olympics
Place of birth missing (living people)
Judoka at the 2002 Commonwealth Games
Commonwealth Games bronze medallists for Nigeria
Commonwealth Games medallists in judo
20th-century Nigerian women
21st-century Nigerian women
Medallists at the 2002 Commonwealth Games